Yolanda Osana Valerio (born August 11, 1987) is a Dominican athlete specializing in the 400 meters hurdles. Her personal best in the event is 57.08 achieved in Guadalajara in 2011. She also played football for the Dominican Republic youth and senior national teams.

Competition record

References

External links
 

1987 births
Living people
Dominican Republic female hurdlers
Dominican Republic women's footballers
Dominican Republic women's international footballers
Pan American Games medalists in athletics (track and field)
Athletes (track and field) at the 2011 Pan American Games
Pan American Games bronze medalists for the Dominican Republic
Medalists at the 2011 Pan American Games
Women's association footballers not categorized by position
20th-century Dominican Republic women
21st-century Dominican Republic women